is a single released by Motohiro Hata. It was released in two versions: a limited edition available until the end of December 2014 and coming with a Doraemon collaboration jacket and slipcase as well as a mini sticker, and a regular edition whose first press came housed in a slipcase. The title track was used as the theme song for the movie Stand by Me Doraemon (2014). It received a digital download single certification from the Recording Industry Association of Japan for sales of a million.

Chart positions

References

2014 songs
Japanese-language songs
Japanese film songs
Songs written for animated films
Anime songs
Doraemon
2014 singles